Israel González may refer to:

 Israel González (basketball) (born 1975), Spanish basketball coach
 Israel González (boxer) (born 1996), Mexican boxer